Roya may refer to:

 Roya (alga), a genus of green algae and a subgroup of Zygnemataceae
 Roya (artist), a Swedish electronic artist, producer and composer
 Roya (river), a river of France and Italy
 Roya (gastropod), a synonym of Williamia, a genus of small sea snails
 Roya (given name), a female proper name of Persian origin, meaning "fantasy" or "dream"
 Roya (singer), an Azerbaijani pop singer
 Roya, Princess Samira’s pet peacock in Shimmer and Shine
 Ro'ya TV, a private Jordanian television station
 Roya, a California based Software as a Service company

Notable people with this name
 Roya Arab, UK-based Iranian musician and archaeologist
 Roya Hakakian, Iranian American Jewish poet, journalist, and writer
 Roya Maboudian, American academic and researcher in the field of chemical engineering
 Roya Megnot, American actress
 Roya Mirelmi, Iranian theater, cinema and television actress
 Roya Nonahali, Iranian actress and director
 Roya Rahmani, Afghan diplomat
 Roya Ramezani, Iranian designer and women's rights campaigner
 Roya Rozati, India-based gynecologist and infertility specialist
 Roya Saberi Negad Nobakht, Iranian-British housewife who was imprisoned after she returned to Iran
 Roya Sadat, Afghan film producer and director
 Roya Teymourian, Iranian actress
 Roya Toloui, Kurdish-Iranian journalist, human rights activist and feminist

See also 
 Roia (disambiguation)
 Royal (disambiguation)